The Mary Ellen Parmley House, at 8850 S. 220 East in Sandy, Utah, is a one-story, wood-frame house built originally around 1898 as a Hall-Parlor cottage.  It has had several additions on its west side.  The first addition plus original portion make a T-shaped crosswing form.

It was listed on the National Register of Historic Places in 2000. And it is also known as 316 South 220 East.

References

		
National Register of Historic Places in Salt Lake County, Utah
Houses completed in 1898